Love Happens is a 2009 American romantic drama film written by Mike Thompson and Brandon Camp, directed by Camp, and starring Aaron Eckhart and Jennifer Aniston. The story follows a therapist and self-help author being enamored by a florist. It was released on September 18, 2009 by Universal Pictures. Love Happens garnered negative reviews from critics but was a minor box office hit, grossing $36.1 million against its $18 million budget.

Plot
Burke Ryan is a successful therapist, holder of a Ph.D. and author of a self-help book that gives advice about dealing with the loss of a loved one. He writes the book after his wife dies in a car accident as a way to deal with the grief.

While giving a workshop in Seattle, where his wife was from, he meets Eloise, a creative floral designer who owns a flower shop. She spurns his initial advance as, until then, her relationships with men have not gone well, but after a heated exchange in the men's restroom, she meets him for dinner. Even though the dinner is awkward, they begin spending time together although, as she insists to her mother and her employee Marty, they are not "dating". Burke also tries to avoid his father-in-law, who believes him to be not following his own advice.

During the workshop, Burke pays special attention to a man named Walter, a former contractor now working as a night janitor after his son died falling off a scaffold, resulting in the loss of his marriage and construction business. Walter came to the seminar on the insistence of his sister, but is unwilling to participate as he doesn't like to express his emotions. Burke ultimately gets through to him by helping him remember his passion for construction and buys him new tools to restart his business.

Eloise suspects Burke is hiding secrets regarding the loss of his wife. She eventually learns the truth from Burke's manager Lane and tells Burke to stop punishing himself. He confesses to an audience that, in reality, he was the one driving the car when his wife died, and not her, as he previously maintained. Due to this, he blames himself for her death and has yet to confront his pain.

His father-in-law, having snuck into the seminar to publicly call him out, comes forward to assure him that his wife's death wasn't his fault, that his in-laws were only upset that he wouldn't mourn her death with them. Their reconciliation onstage receives applause from the audience. Afterward, Burke's father-in-law suggests that it's time to move on with his life.

Burke decides to stay in Seattle and goes to Eloise, saying as she had spent the last few days getting to know the part of him that was not available, he wondered if she'd like to get to know the part of him that was.

Cast
Aaron Eckhart as Burke Ryan, PhD, a widowed self-help author and therapist who holds grieving seminars around the country
Jennifer Aniston as Eloise Chandler, a florist and the woman that Burke begins dating
Frances Conroy as Eloise's mother
Martin Sheen as Burke's father-in-law 
Judy Greer as Marty, Eloise's employee and friend
Dan Fogler as Lane "Goddamn" Marshall, Burke's manager
Joe Anderson as Tyler, Eloise's musician boyfriend, who she breaks up with over his cheating
John Carroll Lynch as Walter, a reluctant seminar attendee who lost his son
Darla Vandenbossche as Beehive
Panou as Unicom Executive #3, a Unicom Exec

Soundtrack

Additional music by:

Production
During development, the film was known as Brand New Day and Traveling. It takes place in Seattle, Washington, and was filmed in Seattle and Vancouver, British Columbia.

On September 15, 2009, a lawsuit was filed by two writers claiming the film's premise was stolen from them, seeking an injunction against its release or to be awarded the film's future profits, estimated at $100,000,000.

Reception
Rotten Tomatoes reported that 16% of critics gave positive reviews based on 110 reviews with a score of 3.8/10. The site's consensus states: "Love Happens is a dull, chemistry-free affair that under-utilizes its appealing leads". Another review aggregator, Metacritic, which assigns a normalized rating from reviews of mainstream critics, gave the film a "generally unfavorable" score of 33% based on 25 reviews.

On its opening weekend, the film opened at #4 behind I Can Do Bad All By Myself, The Informant!, and Cloudy with a Chance of Meatballs respectively with $8,057,010.

Home media 
Love Happens was released on DVD & Blu-ray on February 2, 2010. It grossed $7,721,633 in US DVD sales.

References

External links
 
 
 
 
 
 
 

2009 films
2009 romantic drama films
American romantic drama films
Films about grieving
Films about widowhood
Films produced by Scott Stuber
Films scored by Christopher Young
Films set in Seattle
Films set in Washington (state)
Films shot in Vancouver
Films shot in Washington (state)
Relativity Media films
Universal Pictures films
2000s English-language films
Films directed by Brandon Camp
2000s American films